The 1842 Massachusetts gubernatorial election was held on November 14, 1842.

Incumbent Whig Governor John Davis was defeated by Democratic nominee and former Governor Marcus Morton.

Since no candidate received a majority in the popular vote, Morton was elected by the Massachusetts Senate per the state constitution.

General election

Candidates
Marcus Morton, Democratic, former Governor
John Davis, Whig, incumbent Governor
Samuel E. Sewall, Liberty

Results

Legislative election
As no candidate received a majority of the vote, the Massachusetts House of Representatives was required nominate two of the four top vote-getters to the Massachusetts Senate, which then chose one of the two as Governor. The House nominated Davis and Morton. The election in the Senate was held on January 17, 1843.

References

Bibliography 
 

1842
Massachusetts
Gubernatorial